Makalanga is a settlement in Kenya's Coast Province.

"Makalanga" is also used to denote a Mashona tribe, also called the Makalaka, according to Wikipedia article Makalaka.

References 

Populated places in Coast Province